Trichadjinga batchianensis is a species of beetle in the family Cerambycidae, and the only species in the genus Trichadjinga. It was described by Breuning in 1975.

References

Desmiphorini
Beetles described in 1975
Monotypic beetle genera